Sidney Harrold (5 September 1895–unknown) was an English footballer who played in the Football League for Accrington Stanley, Leicester City and Nottingham Forest.

References

1895 births
English footballers
Association football forwards
English Football League players
Willenhall F.C. players
Stourbridge F.C. players
Wednesbury Old Athletic F.C. players
Leicester City F.C. players
Nottingham Forest F.C. players
Accrington Stanley F.C. (1891) players
Year of death missing